Martensitic stainless steel is a type of stainless steel alloy that has a martensite crystal structure. It can be hardened and tempered through aging and heat treatment. The other main types of stainless steel are austenitic, ferritic, duplex, and precipitation hardened.

History 
In 1912, Harry Brearley of the Brown-Firth research laboratory in Sheffield, England, while seeking a corrosion-resistant alloy for gun barrels, discovered and subsequently industrialized a martensitic stainless steel alloy. The discovery was announced two years later in a January 1915 newspaper article in The New York Times. Brearly applied for a U.S. patent during 1915. This was later marketed under the "Staybrite" brand by Firth Vickers in England and was used for the new entrance canopy for the Savoy Hotel in 1929 in London.

The characteristic body-centered tetragonal martensite microstructure was first observed by German microscopist Adolf Martens around 1890.  In 1912, Elwood Haynes applied for a U.S. patent on a martensitic stainless steel alloy. This patent was not granted until 1919.

Overview 
Martensitic stainless steels can be high- or low-carbon steels built around the composition of iron, 12% up to 17% chromium,  carbon from 0.10% (Type 410) up to 1.2% (Type 440C):
 Up to about 0.4%C they are used mostly for their mechanical properties in applications such as pumps, valves, and shafts.
 Above 0.4%C they are used mostly for their wear resistance, such as in cutlery surgical blades, plastic injection molds, and nozzles.

They may contain some Ni (Type 431) which allows a higher Cr and/or Mo content, thereby improving corrosion resistance and as the carbon content is also lower, the toughness is improved. Grade EN 1.4313 (CA6NM) with a low C, 13%Cr and 4%Ni offers good mechanical properties, good castability, and good weldability. It is used for nearly all the hydroelectric turbines in the world, including those of the huge "Three Gorges" dam in China.

Additions of B, Co, Nb, Ti improve the high temperature properties, particularly creep resistance. This is used for heat exchangers in steam turbines.

Chemical compositions 

There are many proprietary grades not listed in the standards, particularly for cutlery.

Mechanical Properties 
They are hardenable by heat treatment (specifically by quenching and stress relieving, or by quenching and tempering (referred to as QT). The alloy composition, and the high cooling rate of quenching enable the formation of martensite.  Untempered martensite is low in toughness and therefore brittle.Tempered martensite gives steel good hardness and high toughness as can be see below; used largely for medical tools (scalpels, razors and internal clamps).  

In the heat treatment column, QT refers to Quenched and Tempered, P refers to Precipitation hardened

Physical properties

Processing 
When formability, softness, etc. are required in fabrication, steel having 0.12% maximum carbon is often used in soft condition. In this condition, these steels find many useful general applications where mild corrosion resistance is required. Also, with the higher carbon range in the hardened and lightly tempered condition, tensile strength of about  may be developed with lowered ductility.

A common example of a Martensitic stainless steel is X46Cr13.

Martensitic stainless steel can be nondestructively tested using the magnetic particle inspection method, unlike austenitic stainless steel.

Applications

Martensitic stainless steels, depending upon their carbon content are often used for their corrosion resistance and high strength in pumps, valves, and boat shafts.

They are also used for their wear resistance in, cutlery, medical tools (scalpels, razors and internal clamps), ball bearings, razor blades, injection molds for polymers, and brake disks for bicycles and motorbikes.

References

Building materials
Stainless steel